Mark Andrew Lackie (born March 23, 1967 in Saint John, New Brunswick) is a Canadian short track speed skater who competed in the 1992 Winter Olympics.

In 1992 he was a member of the Canadian relay team which won the silver medal in the 5000 metre relay competition. In the 1000 m event he finished seventh.

External links
 profile
 Mark Lackie at the ISU
Mark Lackie at the the-sports.org

1967 births
Living people
Canadian male short track speed skaters
Olympic short track speed skaters of Canada
Short track speed skaters at the 1992 Winter Olympics
Olympic silver medalists for Canada
Olympic medalists in short track speed skating
Medalists at the 1992 Winter Olympics
Sportspeople from Saint John, New Brunswick
20th-century Canadian people